= Mala Bukovica, Travnik =

Mala Bukovica
- Village
- Location within Bosnia and Herzegovina
- Coordinates: 44.2413292°N 17.688066°E
- Country: Bosnia and Herzegovina
- Entity: Federation of Bosnia and Herzegovina
- Canton: Central Bosnia
- Municipality: Travnik

Area
  - Total: 0.77 sq mi (2.00 km^{2})

Population (2013)
  - Total: 126
  - Density: 163/sq mi (63.0/km^{2})
- Time zone: UTC+1 (CET)
  - Summer (DST): UTC+2 (CEST)

Mala Bukovica is a village in the municipality of Travnik, Bosnia and Herzegovina.

== Demographics ==
According to the 2013 census, its population was 126.

Ethnicity in 2013
Ethnicity	Number	Percentage
Croats	125	99.2%
Bosniaks	1	0.8%
Total	126	100%
